Gliese 754 is a dim star in the southern constellation of Telescopium. It has an apparent visual magnitude of 12.25, which requires a telescope to view. The star is located at a distance of 19.3 light-years from the Sun based on parallax, and it is drifting further away with a radial velocity of +7 km/s. It is one of the hundred closest stars to the Solar System. Calculations of its orbit around the Milky Way showed that it is eccentric, and indicate that it might be a thick disk object.

The stellar classification of Gliese 754 is M4V, indicating that this is a small red dwarf star on the core hydrogen fusing main sequence. It has 17% of the mass of the Sun and 21% of the Sun's radius. The star is fully convective and is a source of X-ray emission. It is rotating slowly with a period of about 133 days. The metallicity is sub-solar, indicating it has a lower abundance of heavy elements compared to the Sun. It is radiating just 0.5% of the luminosity of the Sun from its photosphere at an effective temperature of around 3,202 K.

Planetary System
In June 2019, a candidate exoplanet was reported in orbit around Gliese 754. The orbit is essentially circular, to within the margin of error.

References

M-type main-sequence stars
Hypothetical planetary systems
Telescopium (constellation)
0754
J19204795-4533283